Jesper Frödén (born September 21, 1994) is a Swedish professional ice hockey right winger currently playing for the Seattle Kraken of the National Hockey League (NHL).

Playing career
Frödén was awarded Swedish Hockey League Rookie of the Year Award for his achievements during the 2019–20 season.

On 14 June 2021, Frödén was signed as an undrafted free agent to a one-year, two-way contract with the Boston Bruins of the NHL.

Leaving the Bruins as a free agent at the conclusion of his one year tenure with the club, Frödén was signed to a one-year, two-way contract with the Seattle Kraken on 13 July 2022. On 22 February 2023, Frödén was recalled to the Kraken from the Coachella Valley Firebirds.

Career statistics

Regular season and playoffs

International

Awards and honors

References

External links

1994 births
Living people
AIK IF players
Boston Bruins players
Coachella Valley Firebirds players
Providence Bruins players
Seattle Kraken players
Skellefteå AIK players
Södertälje SK players
Ice hockey people from Stockholm
Swedish ice hockey forwards
Undrafted National Hockey League players